Miklajung is a Gaupalika (rural municipality) located at Morang district. Ramite Khola, Jante (Ward No. 3&4), Tandi, and Madhumalla (Ward No.1-6) VDCs were incorporated into Miklajung Gaupalika. This rural municipality has an area of 158.98 km2. The population as of 2017 is 28,708. The current VDC Office of Madhumalla is the office of this Gaupalika.

References 

 
Rural municipalities of Nepal established in 2017
Rural municipalities in Koshi Province
Rural municipalities in Morang District